= Adam Kili =

- Location within Pakistan
- Coordinates: 33.29°N 70.53°E
- Country: Pakistan
- Territory: Federally Administered Tribal Areas
- Elevation: 646 m (2,119 ft)
- Time zone: UTC+5 (PST)
  - Summer (DST): UTC+6 (PDT)

Adam Kili is a town in the Federally Administered Tribal Areas of Pakistan. It is located at 33°17'14N 70°31'31E with an altitude of 646 metres (2,119 ft).
